Graham William Stark (20 January 1922 – 29 October 2013) was an English comedian, actor, writer and director.

Early life 
The son of a purser on transatlantic liners, Stark was born in New Brighton (part of Wallasey) in Wirral, Cheshire, England. He attended Wallasey Grammar School and made his professional stage debut aged 13 in pantomime at the Lyceum Theatre in London.

During the Second World War he served in 334 company of the BEF in Salonika, Greece, where he was a turner in group workshops. While there he first met Dick Emery, Tony Hancock and Peter Sellers, the latter two as fellow members of Ralph Reader's Gang Shows. Sellers would become a long-lasting close friend. With the Gang Shows, Stark toured the locations where military personnel were seeing active service. After the war he studied at the Royal Academy of Dramatic Art, and joined the regulars at Grafton's, a pub in Victoria run by Jimmy Grafton, a venue at which soon-to-be-prominent entertainers of the next few decades regularly gathered.

Career 
Stark began to work on BBC Radio in the postwar years, helped by Tony Hancock's connections, making his debut in Happy Go Lucky and going on to Ray's a Laugh, thanks to the intervention of Sellers, For a time he was a regular in Educating Archie and substituted for Spike Milligan on The Goon Show when the comedian was ill. Stark was a regular supporting player on TV with Sellers in A Show Called Fred and Son of Fred, and with Benny Hill. His profile was sufficient for him to gain his own, albeit short-lived, sketch series, The Graham Stark Show (BBC 1964). Now entirely lost, it was scripted by Johnny Speight with each episode featuring a different group of supporting actors, including Deryck Guyler, Arthur Mullard, Derek Nimmo, Patricia Hayes and Warren Mitchell. An episode of Till Death Us Do Part, called "In Sickness and in Health", 1967, where Stark plays decrepit Dr. Kelly, survives.

He became a regular performer in the Pink Panther film series. His first role in the series was as Hercule Lajoy, Inspector Clouseau's stonefaced assistant, in A Shot in the Dark (1964). Along with Herbert Lom and Burt Kwouk, he appeared in more Pink Panther films than any other actor, playing a variety of characters, including reprising Lajoy in Trail of the Pink Panther (1982) and twice playing Dr Auguste Balls (in Revenge of the Pink Panther, 1978; and Son of the Pink Panther, 1993). He was cast as the hotel clerk in the "Does your dog bite" scene in The Pink Panther Strikes Again.  Stark, as well as Lom and Kwouk, each appeared in seven titles from the series.

In the film Alfie (1966), Stark was Humphrey, a timid bus conductor who takes on a woman (Julia Foster) and her child when the title character (played by Michael Caine) refuses commitment. He also played the role of Lord Fortnum's physician, Captain Pontius Kak, in the original stage play of The Bedsitting Room, which opened at the Mermaid Theatre on 31 January 1963. 
Following the death of James Beck in 1973, Stark took over the role of Private Joe Walker in the radio adaptation of Dad's Army.

In 1982, Stark appeared in a cameo role as a butler, alongside Dandy Nichols, in the music video for Adam Ant's UK No. 1 hit "Goody Two Shoes". He played the character of Mr Nadget in the 1994 BBC adaptation of Martin Chuzzlewit.

Personal life 
In 1959 he married Audrey Nicholson, who survived him with their two sons and a daughter. Stark was also an accomplished stills photographer. He was the last known performer to have appeared on The Goon Show during its original run. In 2003 he published an autobiography, Stark Naked. He died in London on 29 October 2013 at age 91, after suffering a stroke.

Filmography as actor 

The Spy in Black (1939) as Bell Boy (uncredited)
Ça c'est du cinéma (1951) (voice, uncredited)
Emergency Call (1952) as Posh Charlie
Down Among the Z Men (1952) as Spider
Forces' Sweetheart (1953) as Simmonds
Flannelfoot (1953) as Ginger
Johnny on the Spot (1954) as Stevie
The Sea Shall Not Have Them (1954) as Corporal (uncredited)
One Good Turn (1955) as Boxing Competitor (uncredited)
They Never Learn (1956) as Plum
The Running Jumping & Standing Still Film (1959) (uncredited)
Inn for Trouble (1960) as Charlie (Driver)
Sink the Bismarck! (1960) as Petty Officer Williams (uncredited)
The Millionairess (1960) as Butler
A Weekend with Lulu (1961) as Chiron
Double Bunk (1961) as Flowerman
Dentist on the Job (1961) as Sourfaced Man
Watch It, Sailor! (1961) as Carnoustie Bligh
On the Fiddle (1961) as Sgt. Ellis
Only Two Can Play (1962) as Hyman
Operation Snatch (1962) as Soldier
A Pair of Briefs (1962) as Police Witness
Village of Daughters (1962) as Postman
She'll Have to Go (1962) as Arnold
The Wrong Arm of the Law (1963) as Sid Copper
The Mouse on the Moon (1963) as Standard Bearer
Lancelot and Guinevere (1963) as Rian
Strictly for the Birds (1963) as Hartley
Ladies Who Do (1963) as Foreman
Becket (1964) as Pope's Secretary (uncredited)
A Shot in the Dark (1964) as Hercule Lajoy
Guns at Batasi (1964) as Sgt. 'Dodger' Brown
Go Kart Go (1964) as Policeman
Those Magnificent Men in Their Flying Machines (1965) as Fireman
San Ferry Ann (1965) as Gendarme
You Must Be Joking! (1965) as McGregor's friend
Runaway Railway (1965) as Grample
Alfie (1966) as Humphrey
The Wrong Box (1966) as Ian Scott Fife
Finders Keepers (1966) as Burke
Casino Royale (1967) as Cashier
Rocket to the Moon (1967) as Grundle
The Plank (1967) as Amorous Van Driver (Harry Nichols)
A Ghost of a Chance (1968) as Thomas Dogood
Salt and Pepper (1968) as Sgt. Walters
The Picasso Summer (1969) as Postman
The Magic Christian (1969) as Waiter
Rhubarb (1969) as Golf Pro. Rhubarb
Start the Revolution Without Me (1970) as Andre Coupe
Doctor in Trouble (1970) as Satterjee
Scramble (1970) (uncredited)
Simon, Simon (1970) as 1st Workman
The Magnificent Seven Deadly Sins (1971) as Guest Appearance (segment "Sloth") (uncredited)
Hide and Seek (1972) as Milkman
A Day at the Beach (1972) as Pipi
Not Now, Darling (1973) as Painter (uncredited) 
Secrets of a Door-to-Door Salesman (1973) as Charlie Vincent
Where's Johnny? (1974) as Professor Graham
The Return of the Pink Panther (1975) as Pepi
I'm Not Feeling Myself Tonight (1976) as Hotel M.C.
Pure as a Lily (1976) as Detective Mike
The Pink Panther Strikes Again (1976) as Hotel Clerk
Gulliver's Travels (1977) (voice)
Hardcore (1977) as Inspector Flaubert
The Prince and the Pauper (1977) as Jester
Let's Get Laid (1978) as Inspector Nugent
What's Up Nurse! (1978) as Carthew
Revenge of the Pink Panther (1978) as Professor Auguste Balls
The Prisoner of Zenda (1979) as Erik
Le Pétomane (1979) as Defence Counsel
There Goes the Bride (1980) as Bernardo Rossi, Headwaiter
The Sea Wolves (1980) as Manners
Hawk the Slayer (1980) as Sparrow
Victor/Victoria (1982) as Waiter
Trail of the Pink Panther (1982) as Hercule Lajoy
Superman III (1983) as Blind Man
Curse of the Pink Panther (1983) as Bored Waiter
Bloodbath at the House of Death (1984) as Blind Man
Blind Date (1987) as Jordan the Butler
Jane and the Lost City (1987) as Tombs
Son of the Pink Panther (1993) as Professor Auguste Balls
The Incredible Adventures of Marco Polo (1998) as Old King

References

External links 
 
 
 
 Article by Roger Lewis

1922 births
2013 deaths
English male comedians
English male film actors
English male television actors
Alumni of RADA
Royal Air Force personnel of World War II
People from Wallasey
English autobiographers